Glyme Valley is a  biological Site of Special Scientific Interest east of Chipping Norton in Oxfordshire.

This linear site runs along two stretches of the valley of the River Glyme, with the upper area encompassing the river's headwaters. The diverse habitats include the river, ponds, fen, marshy grassland, limestone grassland, scrub and wet woodland. There is a large colony of meadow clary, a rare species which is listed in the British Red Data Book of Vascular Plants. There are several badger setts.

References

 

Berkshire, Buckinghamshire and Oxfordshire Wildlife Trust
Sites of Special Scientific Interest in Oxfordshire
Valleys of Oxfordshire